Scotland is a city in Bon Homme County, South Dakota, United States. The population was 785 at the 2020 census.

History
Scotland was laid out in 1879. Scottish immigrants named it for their native country of Scotland.

Geography
Scotland is located at  (43.149108, -97.718460). South Dakota Highway 25 runs north-south through the town.

Scotland has been assigned the ZIP code 57059 and the FIPS place code 57940.

Lake Henry, a popular local fishing lake, is located just east of Scotland.

Demographics

2010 census
As of the census of 2010, there were 841 people, 386 households, and 224 families residing in the city. The racial makeup of the city was 96.7% White, 1.0% African American, 0.8% Native American, 0.2% Asian, and 1.3% from two or more races. Hispanic or Latino of any race were 0.2% of the population.

There were 386 households, of which 21.0% had children under the age of 18 living with them, 47.7% were married couples living together, 6.7% had a female householder with no husband present, 3.6% had a male householder with no wife present, and 42.0% were non-families. 37.6% of all households were made up of individuals, and 22.1% had someone living alone who was 65 years of age or older. The average household size was 2.08 and the average family size was 2.72.

The median age in the city was 50.3 years. 21% of residents were under the age of 18; 5% were between the ages of 18 and 24; 17.8% were from 25 to 44; 25% were from 45 to 64; and 31.2% were 65 years of age or older. The gender makeup of the city was 46.1% male and 53.9% female.

2000 census
As of the census of 2000, there were 891 people and 405 households, out of which 21.7% had children under the age of 18 living with them, 52.6% were married couples living together, 6.7% had a female householder with no husband present, and 38.5% were non-families. 36.0% of all households were made up of individuals, and 25.7% had someone living alone who was 65 years of age or older. The average household size was 2.09 and the average family size was 2.68.

In the city, the population was spread out, with 20.5% under the age of 18, 3.6% from 18 to 24, 19.4% from 25 to 44, 20.2% from 45 to 64, and 36.3% who were 65 years of age or older. The median age was 51 years. For every 100 females, there were 84.1 males. For every 100 females age 18 and over, there were 77.9 males.

The median income for a household in the city was $28,984, and the median income for a family was $34,821. Males had a median income of $27,321 versus $18,542 for females. The per capita income for the city was $15,427. About 7.4% of families and 11.4% of the population were below the poverty line, including 14.1% of those under age 18 and 14.0% of those age 65 or over.

Education
Scotland School District 4-3 operates the town's school.

Notable people
 Robert Dollard, first Attorney General of South Dakota
Ralph Homan, legislator and businessman
Dick Wildung, American football player.
Charles D. Gemar, United States Astronaut.

References

 
Cities in Bon Homme County, South Dakota
Cities in South Dakota
Populated places established in 1879
1879 establishments in Dakota Territory